The 2017–18 EuroLeague Playoffs were played from 17 April to 27 April 2018. Eight teams competed in the Playoffs. The winners qualified for the 2018 EuroLeague Final Four.

Format

In the playoffs, series are best-of-five, so the first team to win three games wins the series. A 2–2–1 format was used – the team with home-court advantage played games 1 and 2 at home while their opponents hosted games 3 and 4. Game 5 was not necessary in all four series.

Qualified teams

Series

|}

Games

Game 1

Game 2

Game 3

Game 4

External links
Official website

2017–18 EuroLeague
Euroleague Playoffs